The dusky bush tanager (Chlorospingus semifuscus) is a species of bird traditionally placed in the family Thraupidae, but now viewed closer to Arremonops in the Passerellidae.

It is found in Colombia and Ecuador. Its natural habitat is subtropical or tropical moist montane forests.

References

dusky bush tanager
Birds of the Colombian Andes
Birds of the Ecuadorian Andes
dusky bush tanager
dusky bush tanager
dusky bush tanager
Taxonomy articles created by Polbot